Ikaika  may refer to:
 A captive orca
 Ikaika Alama-Francis (born 1984), football player
 Ikaika Kahoano (born 1978), singer